The Remington Versa Max, also styled as VERSA MAX, is a gas-operated semi-automatic shotgun introduced by Remington Arms in 2010. It was named the shotgun of the year for 2011 by American Rifleman.

Design
The Versa Max features a patented gas-operated reloading system that "self-regulates gas pressure, based on the length of the shell". The internal cup that holds a shell when it is fired has a series of holes that regulate gas flow; shorter shells expose more of the holes than longer shells. Remington states that the Versa Max "reduces 12 gauge recoil to that of a 20 gauge." The action of the Versa Max is a redesign of the Benelli M4.

Offerings
The Versa Max Sportsman is a reduced-cost variant of the Versa Max. Differences include a bead sight rather than a fiber-optic sight, only one choke rather than five chokes, and reduced cosmetics.

, Remington lists seven versions on their website:
 Versa Max: Synthetic (no camouflage), Realtree AP HD Camo, Waterfowl Pro, Mossy Oak Duck Blind
 Versa Max Sportsman: Plain (no camouflage), Mossy Oak Duck Blind, Mossy Oak Turkey Camo
There are additionally two tactical offerings, the Tactical and Competition Tactical.

References

External links
 Remington Versa Max Review via YouTube

Remington Arms firearms
Semi-automatic shotguns of the United States
Weapons and ammunition introduced in 2010